Hollow Knight is a 2017 Metroidvania video game developed and published by independent developer Team Cherry. In the game, the player controls the Knight, a nameless insectoid warrior, who explores Hallownest, a fallen kingdom plagued by a supernatural disease, known as the infection. The game is set in diverse subterranean locations, and it features friendly and hostile insectoid characters and numerous bosses. Players have the opportunity to unlock new abilities as they explore each location, along with pieces of lore and flavour text that are spread throughout the kingdom.

The concept behind Hollow Knight was originally conceived in 2013 in the Ludum Dare game jam. Team Cherry wanted to create a game inspired by older platformers that replicated the explorational aspects of its influences. It was released for Windows, Linux, and macOS, in early 2017 and for the Nintendo Switch, PlayStation 4, and Xbox One in 2018. After release, Team Cherry supported the game with four expansions.

Hollow Knight was well received by critics, with particular praise for its music, art style, worldbuilding, atmosphere, combat and level of difficulty. By December 2020, the game had sold 3 million copies. A sequel, Hollow Knight: Silksong, is currently in development.

Gameplay

Hollow Knight is a 2D side-scrolling Metroidvania game that takes place in Hallownest, a fictional underground kingdom. The player controls an insect-like, silent, nameless knight while exploring the underground world. The Knight wields a type of sword called a Nail, which is used in both combat and environmental interaction.

In most areas of the game, players encounter hostile bugs and other creatures. Melee combat involves using the Nail to strike enemies from a short distance. The player can also learn spells, allowing for long-range attacks. Defeated enemies drop currency called Geo. The Knight starts with a limited number of hit points, which are represented by masks. "Mask Shards" can be collected throughout the game to increase the player's maximum number of masks. By striking enemies, the Knight gains Soul, which is stored in the Soul Vessel. If all masks are lost, the Knight dies and a Shade enemy appears where they died. The player loses all Geo and can hold a reduced amount of Soul. Players need to defeat the Shade enemy to recover the lost currency and to carry the normal amount of Soul. The game continues from the last visited bench the character sat on, which are scattered throughout the game world and act as save points and places where the player can change their charms. Initially the player can only use Soul to "Focus" and regenerate masks, but as the game progresses, players unlock and collect several offensive spells which consume Soul. Additional Soul Vessels, used to hold more Soul, can be acquired throughout the game.

Many areas feature more challenging enemies and bosses which the player may need to defeat in order to progress further. Defeating some bosses grants the player access to new abilities. Later in the game, players acquire the Dream Nail, a special sword that can access the minds of Hallownest's creatures. It also enables the player to face more challenging versions of a few bosses and to break the seal to the final boss. If the player defeats the final boss of the game, they are given access to a mode called "Steel Soul". In this mode, dying is permanent, i.e. if the Knight loses all of their masks, the save slot will be reset.

During the game, the player encounters bug-themed non-player characters (NPCs) with whom they can interact. These characters provide information about the game's plot and lore, offer aid, and sell items or services. The player can upgrade the Knight's Nail to deal more damage or find Soul Vessels to carry more Soul. During the course of the game, players acquire items that provide new movement abilities including an additional mid-air jump (Monarch Wings), adhering to walls and jumping off them (Mantis Claw), a quick dash (Mothwing Cloak), and a speedy super dash (Crystal Heart). The player can learn other combat abilities, known as Nail Arts, and the aforementioned spells. To further customise the Knight, players can equip various charms, which can be found or purchased from NPCs. Some of their effects include improved combat abilities or skills, granting more masks without regeneration, greater mobility, easier collecting of Geo or Soul, and other transformations to the Knight. Equipping a charm takes up a certain number of limited slots, called notches.

Hallownest consists of several large, inter-connected areas with unique themes. With its nonlinear gameplay design, Hollow Knight does not bind the player to one path through the game nor require them to explore the whole world, there are entire places that can be missed when finishing the game, though there are obstacles that limit the player's access to various areas. The player may need to progress in the story of the game, or acquire a specific movement ability, skill, or item to progress further. To fast travel through the game's world, the player can use Stag Stations, terminals connected to network of tunnels that are traversed via giant stag beetles; players can only travel to previously visited and unlocked stations. Other fast travel methods, such as trams, lifts, and the "Dreamgate", are encountered later in the game.

As the player enters a new area, they do not have access to the map of their surroundings. They must find Cornifer, the cartographer, in order to buy a rough map. As the player explores an area, the map becomes more accurate and complete, although it is updated only when sitting on a bench. The player will need to buy specific items to complete maps, to see points of interest, and to place markers. The Knight's position on the map can only be seen if the player is carrying a specific charm.

Plot
At the outset of the game, the Knight arrives in Dirtmouth, a quiet town that sits just above the remains of the kingdom of Hallownest and is home to Elderbug, the first NPC the knight meets. As the Knight ventures through the ruins, they learn that Hallownest was once a flourishing kingdom which fell after becoming overrun with "The Infection", a supernatural disease that drove the kingdom's citizens to madness and undeath. Hallownest's ruler, The Pale King, had previously attempted to lock away the Infection in the Temple of the Black Egg. Despite the temple's magical seals, the disease managed to escape and Hallownest fell into ruin. The Knight's mission is to find and kill three bugs called the Dreamers, who act as the living seals on the temple door. Once the seals have been removed, the Knight may confront the source of the Infection. This quest brings the Knight into conflict with Hornet, a warrior who tests their combat prowess in several battles.

Through dialogue with non-player characters and environmental imagery, the Knight learns the origins of the Infection. In ancient times, a tribe of moths that lived in Hallownest worshipped the Radiance, a primordial being who could control the minds of other bugs. When the Pale King arrived at Hallownest from afar, he used his powers to give sapience and knowledge to the creatures of the realm. The moths soon joined the other bugs of Hallownest in worshipping the Pale King, draining the power of the Radiance as she was slowly forgotten. Beneath the notice of the Pale King, some worship of the Radiance continued, allowing her to remain alive inside the Dream Realm.

Hallownest prospered until the Radiance began appearing in the dreams of its people, poisoning their minds with the Infection. In an attempt to contain the menace, the Pale King used an ancient power called Void to create the Vessels; creatures that could trap the Infection within their own bodies. The Pale King chose a Vessel known as the Hollow Knight to trap the Radiance, leaving the rest locked in a Void-covered pit called the Abyss. After the Hollow Knight was locked within the Temple of the Black Egg, the Radiance persisted within the Vessel, weakening the temple's seals and allowing the Infection to escape.

Throughout the game, it is implied that the Knight was a Vessel who managed to escape the Abyss. They gradually defeat the Dreamers and their guardians, removing the seals on the door. Inside, they encounter and battle with the infected Hollow Knight. Depending on the player's actions, multiple endings can then be achieved. These endings include the Knight defeating the infected Hollow Knight and taking its place containing the Radiance, defeating the Hollow Knight with Hornet's assistance, or using the Void Heart item to directly fight and defeat the Radiance inside the Dream Realm.

The Grimm Troupe expansion
In the second expansion to Hollow Knight, the Knight lights a "Nightmare Lantern" found hidden in the Howling Cliffs after using the Dream Nail on a masked bug. The lantern summons a mysterious group of circus performers to Dirtmouth, who identify themselves as the Grimm Troupe. Their leader, Troupe Master Grimm, gives the Knight a quest to collect magic flames throughout Hallownest in order to take part in a "twisted ritual". He gives the player the Grimmchild charm, which absorbs the flames into itself, progressing the ritual and allowing the Grimmchild to attack the Knight's enemies. Eventually, the Knight must choose to either complete the ritual by fighting Grimm and his powerful Nightmare King form, or prevent the ritual with the help of Brumm, a traitorous troupe member.

Godmaster expansion
More content was added to Hollow Knight with the fourth and final expansion, Godmaster, in which the Knight can battle harder versions of all of the bosses in the game through a series of challenges. The main hub of the expansion is known as Godhome, and is accessed by using the Dream Nail on a new NPC called the Godseeker. Within Godhome are five "pantheons", each being a "boss rush", containing a set of bosses that must all be defeated consecutively without dying. The final pantheon, the Pantheon of Hallownest, contains every boss in the game or alternate forms of original bosses. If the Knight completes the Pantheon of Hallownest, the Absolute Radiance, a more powerful version of the Radiance, appears, acting as the new final boss. Upon defeating it, two unique endings can then be achieved, each involving the destruction of Godhome by a powerful Void creature.

Development
The idea that prompted the creation of Hollow Knight originated in a game jam, Ludum Dare 2013, in which two of the game's developers, Ari Gibson and William Pellen, developed a game called Hungry Knight, in which the character that would later become the Knight kills bugs to stave off starvation. The game, considered "not very good", used to hold a 1/5 star rating on Newgrounds, but has since increased to 4/5. The developers decided to work on another game jam with the theme "Beneath the Surface", but missed the deadline. However, the concept gave them the idea to create a game with an underground setting, a "deep, old kingdom", and insect characters.

Influences for the game include Faxanadu, Metroid, Zelda II, and Mega Man X. Team Cherry noted that Hallownest was in some ways the inverse of the world tree setting in Faxanadu. The team also noted that they wanted to replicate the sense of wonder and discovery of games from their childhood from such games, in which "[t]here could be any crazy secret or weird creature."

Believing that control of the character was most important for the player's enjoyment of the game, the developers based the Knight's movement on Mega Man X. They gave the character no acceleration when moving horizontally, as well as a large amount of aerial control and the ability to interrupt one's jump with a dash. This was meant to make the player feel that any hit they took could have been avoided right up until the last second.

To create the game's art, Gibson's hand-drawn sketches were scanned directly into the game engine, creating a "vivid sense of place". The developers decided to "keep it simple" in order to prevent the development time from becoming extremely protracted. The complexity of the world was based on Metroid, which allows players to become disoriented and lost, focusing on the enjoyment of finding one's way. Only basic signs are placed throughout the world to direct players to important locations. The largest design challenge for the game was creating the mapping system and finding a balance between not divulging the world's secrets while not being too player-unfriendly.

The game reached a beta state in September 2015 and continued to achieve numerous stretch goals to add in more content after an engine switch from Stencyl to Unity.

Release
Hollow Knight was officially released for Windows on 24 February 2017, with versions for Linux and macOS being released on 11 April of the same year.

The Nintendo Switch version of Hollow Knight was announced in January 2017 and released on 12 June 2018. Team Cherry originally planned to make their game available on the Wii U. Development of the Wii U version began in 2016, alongside the PC version, and it eventually shifted to Switch. The creators of Hollow Knight worked with another Australian developer, Shark Jump Studios, to speed up the porting process. Initially, Team Cherry planned the Switch version to arrive "not too long after the platform's launch"; subsequently they delayed it to early 2018. A release date was not announced until the Nintendo Direct presentation at E3 2018 on 12 June 2018, when it was unveiled the game would be available later that day via Nintendo eShop.

Versions for PlayStation 4 and Xbox One were released as Hollow Knight: Voidheart Edition on 25 September 2018.

An official Hollow Knight Piano Collections sheet music book and album was released in 2019 by video game music label Materia Collective, arranged by David Peacock and performed by Augustine Mayuga Gonzales.

Downloadable content
On 3 August 2017, the "Hidden Dreams" DLC was released, featuring two new optional boss encounters, two new songs in the soundtrack, a new fast travel system, and a new Stag Station to discover. On 26 October 2017, the second DLC "The Grimm Troupe" was released, adding new major quests, new boss fights, new charms, new enemies, and other content. The update also added support for Russian, Portuguese, and Japanese languages. On 20 April 2018, the "Lifeblood" update was released, bringing various optimisations, changes to the colour palette, bug fixes, minor additions as well as a new boss fight. On 23 August 2018, the final DLC, "Godmaster" was released, containing new characters, boss fights, music, a new game mode as well as two new endings. It was renamed from its former title of "Gods and Glory" due to trademark concerns.

Reception

Hollow Knights PC and PlayStation 4 versions received "generally favorable" reviews and the Nintendo Switch version received "universal acclaim", according to review aggregator website Metacritic. Jed Whitaker of Destructoid praised it as a "masterpiece of gaming" and, on PC Gamer, Tom Marks called it a "new classic". IGN praised Hollow Knights visuals, sound, music, and "a million other details" in building atmosphere.

Critics recognised the combat system as simple and nuanced; they praised its responsiveness, or "tightness", similarly to the movement system. On IGN, Marks stated: "The combat in Hollow Knight is relatively straightforward, but starts out tricky ... It rewards patience and skill massively". In his review on PC Gamer, Marks praised the "brilliant" charm system: "What's so impressive about these charms is that I could never find a 'right' answer when equipping them. There were no wrong choices." Adam Abou-Nasr from NintendoWorldReport stated: "Charms offer a huge variety of upgrades ... removing them felt like trading a part of myself for a better chance at an upcoming battle."

The difficulty of Hollow Knight received attention from reviewers and was described as challenging; Vikki Blake of Eurogamer called the game "ruthlessly tough, even occasionally unfair". For Nintendo World Reports Adam Abou-Nasr it also seemed unfair—he had so frustratingly hard that I cannot recommend this game' angrily scrawled in [his] notes"—but "it eventually clicked". Whitaker "never found any of the bosses to be unfair". Destructoid and Nintendo World Report reviewers felt a sense of accomplishment after difficult fights. Critics also made comparisons to the Dark Souls series, noting the mechanic of losing currency on death and having to defeat a Shade to regain it. Destructoid praised this feature, as well as the holding down of a button to heal, because "[t]hey circumvent a couple of issues games have always had, namely appropriate punishment for failing, and a risk-reward system".

Sales
Hollow Knight had sold over 500,000 copies by November 2017 and surpassed 1,000,000 in sales on PC platforms on 11 June 2018, one day before releasing on Nintendo Switch, where it had sold over 250,000 copies in the two weeks after its launch. By July 2018 it had sold over 1,250,000 copies. By February 2019, Hollow Knight had sold over 2,800,000 copies.

Awards
The game was nominated for "Best PC Game" in Destructoids Game of the Year Awards 2017, and for "Best Platformer" in IGN'''s Best of 2017 Awards. It won the award for "Best Platformer" in PC Gamers 2017 Game of the Year Awards. Polygon later named the game among the decade's best.

Sequel

A sequel to Hollow Knight titled Hollow Knight: Silksong, is in development by Team Cherry as of February 2019, and is set to be released on Windows, Mac, Linux, Nintendo Switch, Playstation 4, Playstation 5, Xbox One, and Xbox Series X/S. The sequel will revolve around the character Hornet exploring the kingdom of Pharloom. Game demos of Hollow Knight: Silksong'' demonstrate similar combat styles to the original game, but with several gameplay differences. The player character Hornet is more mobile than the Knight, and uses tools instead of Charms. The game was announced in February 2019 but has not yet received a release date. Team Cherry had previously planned this game as a piece of downloadable content for its predecessor, but decided to market it an individual title as its content grew too large.

Notes

References

External links

2017 video games
Cancelled Wii U games
Fictional knights in video games
Games financed by Indie Fund
Indie video games
Kickstarter-funded video games
Linux games
MacOS games
Metroidvania games
Nintendo Switch games
Platform games
PlayStation 4 games
Single-player video games
Soulslike video games
Video games about insects
Video games developed in Australia
Video games scored by Christopher Larkin (composer)
Video games set in a fictional country
Video games with alternate endings
Windows games
Xbox Cloud Gaming games
Xbox One games